The Jason-class tank landing ship (Hellenic: αρματαγωγό κλάσσης Ιάσων, literally tank-carrier of class Jason) is a class of tank landing ships (LSTs) designed and built in Greece through a cooperation of the Elefsis Shipyards with the National Technical University of Athens and the Hellenic Navy, which ordered the ships in 1986. The first was laid down on 18 April 1987, second in September 1987, third in May 1988, fourth in April 1989 and fifth in November 1989. Completion of all five and in particular the last three was severely delayed by the shipyard's financial problems, which was privatised in October 1997. Greece tried to start building a sixth ship in 2000 but cancelled it before construction began.

The ships are capable of transporting 350 infantry troops, but they can transport up to 1,200 infantry for short distances, and they can also carry up to 22 main battle tanks (MBTs) or a variety of other equipment such as armoured personnel carriers (APCs), howitzers, MLRS launchers, trucks, etc.

The Hellenic Navy used the Jason-class ships to replace older American landing ships from the Second World War era. The Hellenic Navy preferred to not buy new ships from other nations in order to acquire experience in the design and construction of warships entirely in Greece.

Although the new ships replaced Second World War-era LSTs, the Hellenic Navy did not equip the Jason-class ships with marine fighting vehicles (such as BMP-3F) and therefore Greek marines have to use tactical landing methods similar to those of the Second World War era. Although, Greece purchased 76 AAV-7A1 RAMS from EDA of USMC in 2022. Each landing ship can carry up to 15 AAV-7 and 300 Marines. The ships also use two types of Landing Craft Vehicle Personnel (LCVPs): the type 36 and the type 36F (with F meaning Fast).

Ships

Armament and sensors
Each ship of the class is armed with one Oto Melara 76 mm/62 Mod 9 compact naval gun, two Breda 40 mm/70 guns and two smaller Rheinmetall 20 mm guns in twin mounts. A serious drawback of the ships is the lack of a modern CIWS system.

The main radar of the ships is the Thomson-CSF TRS-3030 Triton G which is a G-band, 2D Surface-to-Air & Surface-to-Surface Radar. The ships have installed the Thomson-CSF Vega II command and control system which includes the Pollux TRS3220 fast-scanning radar as a fire control radar system.

References

External links
Jason class landing ship, Hellenic Navy official website

Jason class LST
Tank landing ships